This and That may refer to:

Questo e Quello, a 1983 Italian film
This and That (album), a 1960 album by Pat Boone
This & That, a 2015 book by Mem Fox and Judy Horacek
This & That (album), a 2004 album by Donnie Vie
This 'n That, a 1987 memoir written by Bette Davis with Michael Herskovitz

See also
This or That, an album by Sway & King Tech and DJ Revolution
"This or That", a song by Reks from Rhythmatic Eternal King Supreme